Canton is a city in and the county seat of Stark County, Ohio, United States. As of the 2020 census, the population of Canton was 70,872, making Canton eighth among Ohio cities in population. It is the largest municipality in the Canton–Massillon metropolitan area, which includes all of Stark and Carroll counties, and was home to 401,574 residents in 2020.

Founded in 1805 alongside the Middle and West Branches of Nimishillen Creek, Canton became a heavy manufacturing center because of its numerous railroad lines. However, its status in that regard began to decline during the late 20th century, as shifts in the manufacturing industry led to the relocation or downsizing of many factories and workers. After this decline, the city's industry diversified into the service economy, including retailing, education, finance and healthcare.

Canton is chiefly notable for being the home of the Pro Football Hall of Fame and the birthplace of the National Football League. 25th U.S. President William McKinley conducted the famed front porch campaign, which won him the presidency of the United States in the 1896 election, from his home in Canton. The McKinley National Memorial and the William McKinley Presidential Library and Museum commemorate his life and presidency. Canton was also chosen as the site of the First Ladies National Historic Site largely in honor of his wife, Ida Saxton McKinley.

Beginning in 2015, Canton began experiencing an urban renaissance, anchored by its growing and thriving arts district centrally located in the downtown area.  Several historic buildings have been rehabilitated and converted into upscale lofts, attracting hundreds of new downtown residents into the city.  Furthering this downtown development, in June 2016, Canton became one of the first cities in Ohio to allow the open consumption of alcoholic beverages in a "designated outdoor refreshment area" pursuant to a state law enacted in 2015 (Sub. H.B. No. 47).

History

Founding 
Canton was founded in 1805, incorporated as a village in 1822, and re-incorporated as a city in 1838. The plat of Canton was recorded at New Lisbon, Ohio, on November 15, 1805, by Bezaleel Wells, a surveyor and devout Episcopalian from Maryland born January 28, 1763. Canton was likely named as a memorial to Captain John O'Donnell, an Irish merchant marine with the British East India Trading Company whom Wells admired. O'Donnell named his estate in Maryland after the Chinese city Canton (a traditional English name for Guangzhou) as he had been the first person to transport goods from there to Baltimore.  The name selected by Wells may also have been influenced by the Huguenot use of the word "canton," which meant a division of a district containing several communes. Through Wells' efforts and promotion, Canton was designated the county seat of Stark County upon its division from Columbiana County on January 1, 1809.

Home of President William McKinley and his "Front-Porch" campaign 
For most of his adult life, Canton was the home of William McKinley, the 25th president of the United States. Born in Niles, Ohio, McKinley first practiced law in Canton around 1867, and was prosecuting attorney of Stark County from 1869 to 1871.  The city was his home during his successful campaign for Ohio governor, the site of his front-porch presidential campaign of 1896 and the campaign of 1900.  Canton is now the site of the William McKinley Presidential Library and Museum and the McKinley National Memorial, dedicated in 1907.

Eugene V. Debs' anti-war speech at Nimisilla Park 

On June 16, 1918, Eugene V. Debs delivered the keynote speech at the annual Ohio Socialist Convention held in Canton's Nimisilla Park. At the time, Debs had been a four-time candidate for president and was considered the country's leading socialist and labor organizer. During his speech he decried America's involvement in the First World War, saying, “They have always taught you that it is your patriotic duty to go to war and slaughter yourselves at their command. You have never had a voice in the war. The working class who make the sacrifices, who shed the blood, have never yet had a voice in declaring war.” Among Debs' audience at Nimisilla Park were agents of the U.S. Department of Justice. The year before his speech, and a month following the American entry into the First World War, President Woodrow Wilson signed the Espionage Act of 1917 into law. This Act made it a federal crime to interfere with, among other things, the Selective Service Act or military draft.

On June 30, 1918, Debs was arrested and charged with, among other things, “unlawfully, willfully and feloniously cause and attempt to cause and incite and attempt to incite, insubordination, disloyalty, mutiny and refusal of duty, in the military and naval forces of the United States.” Debs' trial began on September 10, 1918, in the U.S. District Court for the Northern District of Ohio. On September 12, 1918, a jury found Debs guilty. He was sentenced to ten years in prison. On March 10, 1919, the U.S. Supreme Court affirmed the constitutionality of Debs' conviction in Debs v. United States. Debs began serving his prison sentence on April 13, 1919. He remained incarcerated until September 25, 1921, when he was released after President Warren Harding commuted his sentence to time served.

The U.S. Supreme Court's decision affirming Debs' conviction was sharply criticized by legal scholars at the time and is generally regarded as a low-point in First Amendment jurisprudence.  While Debs’ speech in Canton and subsequent conviction ultimately aided Debs in delivering the Socialist Party's anti-war platform, his age and the deleterious effects of prison exhausted his ability as an orator. Debs died of heart failure on October 20, 1926. In June 2017 Canton applied for and received a historic marker from the Ohio History Connection, formerly the Ohio Historical Society, to commemorate Debs' speech at Nimisilla Park and other historic events reflecting the park's importance as a gathering place for the community.

Major companies 

The Dueber-Hampden Watch Company was an important employer in Canton during the early 1920s. It formally organized in 1923, having previously consisted of two separate companies: the Dueber Watch Case Company and the Hampden Watch Company. In 1886, John Dueber, the owner of the Dueber Watch Case Company, purchased a controlling interest in the Hampden Watch Company. In 1888, he relocated the Hampden Watch Company from Springfield, Massachusetts and the Dueber Watch Case Company from Newport, Kentucky to Canton, Ohio. These two companies shared manufacturing facilities in Canton but remained two separate companies. The Dueber Watch Case Company and the Hampden Watch Company quickly became two of Canton's largest employers. In 1888, the companies' first year in Canton, they employed 2,300 Canton residents. In 1890, Canton's population was 26,337. Thanks to these two companies, Canton became an important center for watch manufacturing in the United States. In 1927 the company went bankrupt, finally ceasing operations in the city in 1930. The machinery and tools were sold to the Amtorg Trading Corporation, one of Soviet Russia's buying agencies in the US, for $329.000.  The company's massive brick factories, which covered more than 20 acres and included an ornate 150-foot clock tower, were demolished to accommodate the construction of Interstate 77.

The Timken Company has been among the largest employers in Canton for nearly 100 years. In 1898, Henry Timken obtained a patent for the tapered roller bearing, and in 1899 incorporated as the Timken Roller Bearing Axle Company in St. Louis.  In 1901, the company moved to Canton as the automobile industry began to overtake the carriage industry. Timken and his two sons chose this location because of its proximity to the American car manufacturing centers of Detroit and Cleveland and the American steel-making centers of Pittsburgh and Cleveland.  By 1960, Timken had operations in the U.S., Canada, Great Britain, France, South Africa, Australia and Brazil. The company changed its corporate structure in 2014; the roller bearing-producing part of the company was separated from the steel-producing part of the company, resulting in two separate companies. The Timken Company continues to manufacture roller bearings, while TimkenSteel produces steel.

Today, TimkenSteel remains headquartered in Canton and employs 2,800 people, most of them in Northeast Ohio. The company makes special bar quality steel, used in applications all over the world.  The Timken Co. is now headquartered in Jackson Township, a suburb of Canton, and employs 14,000 people around the world.  The company designs, engineers, manufactures and sells bearings, transmissions, gearboxes, chain and related products, and offers a spectrum of power system rebuild and repair services around the globe.

Football history 
On September 17, 1920, a meeting was held at the Hupmobile showroom in the Independent Order of Odd Fellows Building in Canton to found the American Professional Football Association (renamed the National Football League in 1922). The attendees included Ralph Hay, owner of the Hupmobile showroom and the hometown Canton Bulldogs, and George Halas, owner of the Decatur Staleys. Jim Thorpe of the Bulldogs was the league's first president. In 2014 a sculpture titled Birth of the NFL was erected in downtown Canton marking the exact location in the Hupmobile showroom where the NFL was created in 1920.

On December 6, 1959, the Canton Repository, a local newspaper, called for city officials to lobby the National Football League to create a football hall of fame in the community.  Canton officials formally proposed their city as site for the hall of fame in 1961. The NFL quickly agreed to the city's proposal. To help convince NFL officials to locate the hall of fame in Canton, city officials donated several acres of land on Canton's north side to the project. Local residents also raised almost $400,000 to help construct the hall of fame.

The Pro Football Hall of Fame formally opened on September 7, 1963. Initially the museum consisted of two buildings, but in 1971, 1978, 1995, and 2013, the Pro Football Hall of Fame experienced several expansions. As of 2013, the museum consisted of five buildings, covering 118,000 square feet. Since its founding, over 10 million people have visited the Pro Football Hall of Fame. "Welcome to Canton" is the official way of saying congratulations to a new enshrinee.

Geography

Topography

Nimishillen Creek and its East, Middle and West Branches flow through the city.

Canton is bordered by Plain Township and North Canton to the north, Meyers Lake and Perry Township to the west, Canton Township to the South, and Nimishillen Township, Osnaburg Township and East Canton to the east. Annexations were approved in December 2006 extending Canton's eastern boundary to East Canton's border.

Climate
Canton has a humid continental climate (Köppen climate classification Dfa), typical of much of the Midwestern United States, with warm, humid summers and cold winters. Snowfall is lighter than the snow belt areas to the north. Akron-Canton Airport generally averages  of snow per season. Springs are short with rapid transition from hard winter to summer weather. Summer weather is more stable, generally humid with thunderstorms fairly common. Temperatures reach or exceed  about 10 times each summer, on average. Fall usually is the driest season with many clear, warm days and cool nights.

Address system
Canton's street layout forms the basis for the system of addresses in Stark County. Canton proper is divided into address quadrants (NW, NE, SW, SE) by Tuscarawas Street (dividing N and S) and Market Avenue (dividing E and W). Due to shifts in the street layout, the E–W divider becomes Cleveland Avenue south of the city, merging onto Ridge Road farther out. The directionals are noted as suffixes to the street name (e.g. Tuscarawas St W, 55th Street NE). Typically within the city numbered streets run east and west and radiate from the Tuscarawas Street baseline, while named avenues run north and south.

This system extends into Stark County but is not shared by the cities of Massillon, Louisville, East Canton, Minerva or North Canton, which have their own internal address grids.

Neighborhoods 

 Downtown
 Crystal Park
 Dueber
 Harter Heights
 Sherrick Road Corridor 
 Market Heights
 Historic Ridgewood District
 Shorb 
 Summit
 Vassar Park
 West Branch Park
 West Park
 Edgefield
 Lathrop 
 Gibbs 
 Colonial Heights
 Mt. Vernon 
 Harrison Hills 
 Plain Center Estates
 Westbrook Veterans Memorial Park

Ridgewood Historic District 

The Ridgewood Historic District is a historic residential neighborhood in Canton that, due to its architectural significance, was added to the U.S. National Register of Historic Places on December 19, 1982. The neighborhood consists of preserved, architect-designed Revival style buildings of the Tudor, Georgian, and French-Norman styles built in the early 20th century with amenities such as original brick streets and locally produced street lighting standards. The District features homes designed by several distinguished architects, including Charles Firestone, Herman Albrecht, and Louis Hoicowitz.

Demographics

Canton is the largest principal city of the Canton-Massillon Metropolitan Statistical Area, a metropolitan area that covers Carroll and Stark counties and had a combined population of 404,422 at the 2010 census.

2020 census

Note: the US Census treats Hispanic/Latino as an ethnic category. This table excludes Latinos from the racial categories and assigns them to a separate category. Hispanics/Latinos can be of any race.

2010 census
As of the census of 2010, there were 73,007 people, 29,705 households, and 17,127 families residing in the city. The racial makeup of the city was 69.1% White, 24.2% African American, 0.5% Native American, 0.3% Asian, 1.0% from other races, and 4.8% from two or more races. Hispanic or Latino people of any race were 2.6% of the population.

There were 29,705 households, of which 31.5% had children under the age of 18 living with them, 30.8% were married couples living together, 21.1% had a female householder with no husband present, 5.7% had a male householder with no wife present, and 42.3% were non-families. 35.4% of all households were made up of individuals, and 11.6% had someone living alone who was 65 years of age or older. The average household size was 2.35 and the average family size was 3.04.

The median age in the city was 35.6 years. 25.1% of residents were under the age of 18; 10.8% were between the ages of 18 and 24; 25.6% were from 25 to 44; 25.6% were from 45 to 64; and 12.8% were 65 years of age or older. The gender makeup of the city was 47.4% male and 52.6% female.

2000 census
As of the census of 2000, there were 80,806 people, 32,489 households, and 19,785 families residing in the city. The population density was 3,932.1 people per square mile (1,518.2/km2). There were 35,502 housing units at an average density of 1,728.0 per square mile (667.0/km2). The racial makeup of the city was 74.45% White, 21.04% African American, 0.49% Native American, 0.32% Asian, 0.03% Pacific Islander, 0.61% from other races, and 3.06% from two or more races. Hispanic or Latino people of any race were 1.24% of the population.

There were 32,489 households, out of which 30.0% had children under the age of 18 living with them, 37.1% were married couples living together, 19.1% had a female householder with no husband present, and 39.1% were non-families. 33.0% of all households were made up of individuals, and 12.4% had someone living alone who was 65 years of age or older. The average household size was 2.39 and the average family size was 3.04.

In the city the age distribution of the population shows 26.6% under the age of 18, 9.8% from 18 to 24, 29.1% from 25 to 44, 20.2% from 45 to 64, and 14.3% who were 65 years of age or older. The median age was 34 years. For every 100 females, there were 87.5 males. For every 100 females age 18 and over, there were 81.9 males.

The median income for a household in the city was $28,730, and the median income for a family was $35,680. Males had a median income of $30.628 versus $21,581 for females. The per capita income for the city was $15,544. About 15.4% of families and 19.2% of the population were below the poverty line, including 27.4% of those under age 18 and 11.3% of those age 65 or over.

Economy

The Canton area's economy is primarily industrial, with significant health care and agricultural segments. The city is home to the TimkenSteel Corporation, a major manufacturer of specialty steel. Several other large companies operate in the greater-Canton area, including Timken Company a maker of tapered roller bearings; Belden Brick Company, a brick and masonry producer; Diebold, a maker of ATMs, electronic voting devices, and bank vaults, and Medline Industries, a manufacturer and distributor of health care supplies. The area is also home to several regional food producers, including Nickles Bakery (baked goods), Case Farms (poultry), and Shearer's Foods (snack foods). Poultry production and dairy farming are also important segments of the Canton area's economy.

Since 2000, Canton has experienced a very low unemployment rate.  The healthcare sector is particularly strong, with Aultman Hospital and Mercy Medical Center among its largest employers.  Nevertheless, as in many industrial areas of the United States, employment in the manufacturing sector is in a state of decline. LTV Steel (formerly Republic Steel) suffered bankruptcy in 2000. Republic Steel emerged and continues to maintain operations in Canton. Hoover Company, a major employer for decades in the region, reached an agreement to sell Hoover to Hong Kong-based Techtronic Industries. The main plant in nearby North Canton closed its doors in September 2007 due to classified reasons.  On June 30, 2014, the Timken Company and TimkenSteel split, forming two separate companies at the urging of shareholders.  The Timken Company relocated to neighboring Jackson Township, while TimkenSteel remains headquartered in Canton.  In response to this changing manufacturing landscape, the city is undergoing a transition to a retail and service-based economy.

Beginning in the 1970s, Canton, like many mid-size American cities, lost most of its downtown retail business to the suburbs. The majority of the Canton area's "box store" retail is located in the general vicinity of the Belden Village Mall in Jackson Township. However, in recent years, the downtown area has seen significant rejuvenation, with cafes, restaurants, and the establishment of an arts district. A few retail centers remain in Canton at or near the city limits. Tuscarawas Street (Lincoln Way), a leg of the Lincoln Highway connecting Canton with nearby Massillon, is home to the Canton Centre mall and several retail outlets of varying size. A vein of commerce runs along Whipple Avenue, connecting the Canton Centre area with the Belden Village area. A similar vein runs north from the downtown area, along Cleveland and Market avenues. Connecting Cleveland and Market avenues is a small shopping district on 30th Street NW, and retail lines the Route 62 corridor leading from Canton to Louisville and Alliance.

During the past century Canton has come to experience a renaissance. At the heart of this transformation is the Pro Football Hall of Fame, with its multimillion-dollar "Hall of Fame Village" expansion project.  This project has been complemented with significant investments by city leaders in urban redevelopment, which continued with the transformation of the Hotel Onesto into the Historic Onesto Lofts.  Other urban renewal plans are underway, which include the redevelopment of the downtown Market Square area.  Private investment has furthered Canton's transformation, which is illustrated by the multimillion-dollar creation of the Gervasi Vineyard, which draws patrons throughout the region.  In furtherance of these development initiatives, Canton was one of the first cities in Ohio to create a "designated outdoor refreshment area" legalizing the possession and consumption of "open container" alcoholic beverages in its downtown area.

Principal employers

According to Canton's 2017 Comprehensive Annual Financial Report, the top employers in the city are:

Arts and culture
The Canton Museum of Art, founded in 1935, is a broad-based community arts organization designed to encourage and promote the fine arts in Canton. The museum focuses on 19th- and 20th-century American artists, specifically works on paper, and on American ceramics, beginning in the 1950s. The museum sponsors annual shows of work of high school students in Canton and Stark County, and financial scholarships are awarded. Educational outreach programs take the museum off-site to libraries, parochial schools, area public schools, five inner city schools and a school for students with behavioral disorders. The city's Arts District, located downtown, is the site of monthly First Friday arts celebrations.

Canton has the main branch of Stark County District Library.

Government

Local government
Canton has a mayor–council government and is the largest city in Ohio to operate without a charter. The city council is divided among nine wards with three at-large seats and the council president.
The 2018–2019 elected officials of the City of Canton consist of:

State government
Canton is represented by the following office holders at the Ohio state government:

Federal government 
The City of Canton is represented by the following U.S. federal officials:

Education

Canton's K-12 students are primarily served by the public Canton City School District, which included eight elementary schools, three middle schools, and two high schools, in addition to alternative education centers. A portion of northern Canton is included in the Plain Local School District, and another overlap exists with the suburban Canton Local School District. 

Catholic grade schools within the city limits of Canton are St. Peter, St. Joseph, and Our Lady of Peace. Additional Catholic schools in the Canton area include Canton St. Michael School, ranked first in the Power of the Pen state tournament in 2010, and Canton St. Joan of Arc School. There is also Heritage Christian School (K-12), a Christian grade school and high school. Canton Country Day School is a private PreK-8 school located just outside city limits in nearby Plain Township. Within the city limits is the private Canton Montessori School, which teaches according to the Montessori Plan for education proposed by Maria Montessori in the early 20th century.

Malone University, a private, four-year liberal arts college affiliated with the Evangelical Friends Church, is located on 25th Street NW. Catholic-run Walsh University is located nearby in North Canton. Stark State College and a branch of Kent State University are also nearby, in Jackson Township. Also, in downtown Canton, there is a small annex for Stark State College to be used by the early college high school students who are located on the Timken Campus.

Media

Print
Canton is served in print by The Repository, the city's only newspaper.

TV
Canton is part of the Cleveland/Akron/Canton television media market. Four stations are licensed to Canton – full-power WDLI (Bounce) and WRLM (TCT), and low-power WOHZ-CD (CBS/CW - WOIO/WUAB simulcast) and WIVM-LD (Independent). The two full-power stations identify as Canton/Akron/Cleveland, serving the entire market, while the two low-power stations specifically serve Canton.

Canton also has a cable Public-access television channel, Canton City Schools TV 11. The content varies based on the viewer's location. Citizens located in North Canton will see North Canton's programming instead of Canton City's. Those within the borders of Plain Local Schools will see Eagle Television's programming.

Radio
On the radio side, Canton is served by WKRW 89.3 (NPR - WKSU simulcast), WDJQ 92.5 (Contemporary hits), WHBC-FM 94.1 (Hot AC), WHOF 101.7 (Classic hits), WRQK 106.9 (Rock), WTIG 990 (Sports), WILB 1060 (Catholic), WDPN 1310 (Soft AC), WHBC 1480 (News/Talk), and WINW 1530 (Gospel).

Sports

Canton is home to the Pro Football Hall of Fame. The American Professional Football Association, the forerunner of the NFL, was founded in a Canton car dealership on September 17, 1920.

The Canton Bulldogs were an NFL football team that played from 1920 to 1923, skipped the 1924 season, then played 1925 to 1926 before folding.

Canton is the home of the annual Pro Football Hall of Fame Enshrinement Festival, which includes a hot air balloon festival, ribs burn-off, fashion show, community parade, Sunday morning race, enshrinee dinner, and the Pro Football Hall of Fame Grand Parade. The festival culminates in the enshrinement of the new inductees and the NFL/Hall of Fame Game, a pre-season exhibition between teams representing the AFC and NFC at Tom Benson Hall of Fame Stadium.

Tom Benson Hall of Fame Stadium, used during the regular season by Canton McKinley High School (as well as some other area schools and colleges), was rated the number one high school football venue in America by the Sporting News in 2002.  This may be partly attributable to the Bulldogs' rivalry with the nearby Massillon Washington High School Tigers, which is regarded as one of the best rivalries in all of high school football.  All seven of the Ohio High School Athletic Association state final football games are hosted in Canton at Tom Benson Hall of Fame Stadium.

The Canton Legends played in the American Indoor Football Association at the Canton Civic Center. Operations were suspended in 2009. The Continental Indoor Football League also has offices in Canton.

The first official female bodybuilding competition was held in Canton in November 1977 and was called the Ohio Regional Women's Physique Championship.

For ten seasons, Canton was home to an NBA G League team, the Canton Charge, which started play with the 2011–12 season and home games at the Canton Memorial Civic Center. The Cleveland Cavaliers had full control over the franchise and relocated the franchise in to Cleveland in 2021 when the ten-year lease ended.

The Canton Invaders of the National Professional Soccer League II and American Indoor Soccer Association played home games at the Canton Memorial Civic Center from 1984 until 1996, winning five league championships. In 2009, the Ohio Vortex became an expansion team in the Professional Arena Soccer League. Operations have since been suspended.

Canton has been home to professional baseball on several occasions. A number of minor league teams called Canton home in the early 1900s, including the Canton Terriers in the 1920s and 1930s. The Canton–Akron Indians were the AA affiliate of the major league Cleveland Indians for nine years, playing at Thurman Munson Memorial Stadium until the team relocated north to Akron following the 1996 season. Two independent minor league teams, the Canton Crocodiles and the Canton Coyotes, both members of the Frontier League, called Munson Stadium home for several years afterward. The Crocodiles, who won the league championship in their inaugural season in 1997, moved to Washington, Pennsylvania, in 2002, and the Coyotes moved to Columbia, Missouri, in 2003, after just one season in Canton.

Canton is home to the Bluecoats Drum and Bugle Corps, a world-class competitor in Drum Corps International. The Bluecoats have been a part of the "top five" finalists in the DCI World Championships since 2013, and took home the Founders' Trophy in 2016, with their show entitled "Down Side Up".

Transportation
Canton is connected to the Interstate Highway System via Interstate 77 which connects Canton to Marietta, Ohio, and points south, and to Cleveland and Akron, Ohio, to the north.

U.S. Route 30 connects Canton to Wooster, Ohio, and points west, and to East Liverpool, Ohio, and points east. U.S. Route 62 connects Canton to Millersburg, Ohio, and points southwest, and to Youngstown, Ohio, and points northeast.

The city has several arterial roads. Ohio 43 (Market Avenue, Walnut Avenue and Cherry Avenue), Ohio 153 (12th Street and Mahoning Road), Ohio 172 (Tuscarawas Street) / The Lincoln Highway, Ohio 297 (Whipple Avenue and Raff Avenue), Ohio 627 (Faircrest Street), Ohio 687 (Fulton Drive), and Ohio 800 (Cleveland Avenue) / A.K.A. Old Route 8.

Until 1990, Amtrak's passenger trains Broadway Limited and the Capitol Limited made stops at Canton station. Norfolk Southern and the Wheeling-Lake Erie railroads provide freight service in Canton.

Stark Area Regional Transit Authority (SARTA) provides public transit bus service within the county, including service to Massillon, the Akron-Canton Regional Airport. Amtrak's Capitol Limited makes stops in Alliance station,  to the northeast.

In February 2022, it was reported that SARTA had hired a consultant group to study the feasibility of a light rail line from the Pro Football Hall of Fame to downtown Canton, with possible expansion to other locations around the county in the future. In June of that same year, the full plan was released, calling for a nine mile line from Akron-Canton Airport to downtown, where it would run down 3rd street in a separated lane from traffic. It would connect to existing bus services near Belden Village Mall and Cornerstone Transit Center. A first round of public meetings was held.

Notable people

Sister cities
Canton has two sister cities:
 – Acre, Israel
 – Saltillo, Coahuila, Mexico

References

External links

 City website

 
Cities in Ohio
Cities in Stark County, Ohio
Populated places established in 1805
County seats in Ohio
1805 establishments in Ohio